Parornix altaica is a moth of the family Gracillariidae. It is known from the central Asian part of Russia.

References

Parornix
Moths of Asia
Moths described in 2006